Henki Kolstad (3 February 1915 – 14 July 2008) was a Norwegian actor and pop-cultural national treasure. With his debut at the Oslo national theater, he was known for his appearances in Olsenbanden, the children's series Jul i Skomakergata, Herr Klinke in Den Spanske Flue, and Vi gifter oss. Notable mentions include the Amanda and the Order of St. Olav awards.

Kolstad and his wife Else were together for 76 years. They had one son and two daughters.

Henki was also known for voicing several local Disney characters such as the Sheriff of Nottingham in  Robin Hood, Grumpy in the 1982 dub of  Snow White and the Seven Dwarfs, Maurice in Beauty and the Beast and the Sultan of Agrabah in  Aladdin.

Henki's younger brother, Lasse Kolstad, was also a well-known actor.

Selected filmography

 1930: Eskimo
 1932: The White God
 1943: Vigdis
 1948: Kampen om tungtvannet
 1949: Svendsen går videre
 1950: To mistenkelige personer as a tramp
 1951: Alt dette og Island med
 1951: Vi gifter oss
 1952: Emergency Landing
 1954: Troll i ord
 1957: Selv om de er små
 1957: Stevnemøte med glemte år
 1958: De dødes tjern
 1959: 5 loddrett
 1960: Millionær for en aften
 1961: Et øye på hver finger
 1961: Line
 1963: Freske fraspark
 1963: Vildanden
 1964: Pappa tar gull
 1965: Skjær i sjøen
 1967: Gutten som kappåt med trollet
 1974: Fleksnes Fataliteter: Trafikk og panikk (#2.6) (TV)
 1979: Jul i Skomakergata (TV)
 1985: Deilig er fjorden!
 1988: Folk og røvere i Kardemomme by
 1990: Spanske flue, Den (TV)
 1999: Olsenbandens siste stikk

References

External links
Obituary in English from Aftenposten.

1915 births
2008 deaths
Male actors from Oslo
Norwegian male child actors
Norwegian male stage actors
Norwegian male film actors
Norwegian male television actors